Codex Seidelianus I, designated by siglum Ge or 011 (in the Gregory-Aland numbering), ε 87 (von Soden), also known as Codex Wolfii A and Codex Harleianus is a Greek uncial manuscript of the Gospels, dated palaeographically to the 9th century (or 10th century). The codex contains 252 parchment leaves. The manuscript is lacunose.

Description 
The codex contains the text of the four Gospels with some lacunae (Matthew 1:1-6:6, 7:25-8:9, 8:23-9:2, 28:18-Mark 1:13, Mark 14:19-25, Luke 1:1-13, 5:4-7:3, 8:46-9:5, 12:27-41, 24:41-end, John 18:5-19, 19:4-27). 
The text is written in 2 columns per page, 21 lines per page. It was written in a coarse hand.

The text is divided according to the Ammonian Sections, whose numbers are given at the margin, with references to the Eusebian Canons. It has breathings and accents, but often irregularly. Each member of the genealogy in Luke 3 forms a separate line.  
Some portions of these lacunae are rectified by a later hand.

Text 

The Greek text of this codex is a secondary representative of the Byzantine text-type with many of the non-Byzantine readings seeming to be the Caesarean. Aland gave to it textual profile 1761 871/2 42 21s and  placed it in Category V. Hermann von Soden classified it to the family Ki, but according to the Claremont Profile Method it belongs to the textual family Kx.

History 
The codex was brought from the East to Germany by Seidel († 1718). After his death in 1718 Maturin Veyssière de La Croze, royal librarian from Berlin acquired it and presented to Wolf, who published extracts from its text in 1723. The codex was barbarously mutilated in 1721 in order to send pieces to Bentley. Most of them were purchased by Eduard Harley. Some of fragments were found by Tregelles in 1845. Tregelles collated its text in 1847.

The codex was known to Wettstein, who gave siglum G for it. Griesbach designated it by the same siglum.

Later it became part of the library of Edward Harley, and is now located in the British Library (Harley MS 5684), and one page, which Wolff gave to Richard Bentley, is in Cambridge (Trinity College B. XVII. 20).

See also 

 List of New Testament uncials
 Textual criticism

References

Further reading 

 J. C. Wolff, "Anecdota Graeca" (Hamburg, 1723), III, pp. 48–92. 
 S. P. Tregelles, Account of the Printed Text, p. 160.

External links 
 R. Waltz, Codex Seidelianus Ge (011): at the Encyclopedia of Textual Criticism (2007)
 Images at the British Library
 Harley MS 5684 BL

Greek New Testament uncials
9th-century biblical manuscripts
Harleian Collection